Malta participated at the 2018 Summer Youth Olympics in Buenos Aires, Argentina from 6 October to 18 October 2018.

Athletics

Swimming

Boys

Tennis

Singles

Doubles

Weightlifting

Malta was given a quota by the tripartite committee to compete in weightlifting.

References

2018 in Maltese sport
Nations at the 2018 Summer Youth Olympics
Malta at the Youth Olympics